The Messe Düsseldorf is a trade fair ground and organizer, based in Düsseldorf, Germany. With a workforce of 1,459 employees worldwide (2006) and a total exhibition space of 306,000 m2 (of which 262,700 m2 is indoors) in Düsseldorf, the company is one of the largest in the industry. More than 40 annual fairs are staged at the premises in Düsseldorf, including 23 leading events in their respective sectors.

History

Based on Düsseldorf's long history of trade fairs, the Trade Fair Organisation (Messe) was founded in 1947 as Nordwestdeutsche Ausstellungsgesellschaft mbH (NOWEA), and is now Messe Düsseldorf GmbH (German form of Ltd.). In 1971, the company moved to the newly built exhibition centre in Stockum, next to the Düsseldorf Airport. In 1993, it hosted the finals of the Davis Cup in one its halls.

Subsidiaries

Areas of activity 
 Machinery, plant and equipment
 Retail and trade, skilled trades and services
 Medicine and health
 Fashion and lifestyle
 Leisure

Figures (2006) 
 Total Exhibitors: 26,222 of which 53% came from abroad
 Total Visitors: 1,297,026 of which 25% came from abroad
 Sales: EUR 303.753 million consolidated sales in 2006, of which EUR 212.258 million generated in Germany

Trade fairs organised by Messe Düsseldorf 

 boot Düsseldorf – International Boat Show
 Caravan Salon International Trade Fair for Caravaning
 drupa – International Trade Fair Printing & Media
 EuroShop – International Trade Fair for the Retail Industry
 GDS & GLS – International Shoe Trade Fair & Leather Goods Fair
 glasstec – International Trade Fair for the Glass Industry
 hogatec – International Trade Fair for the Hotel Trade, Gastronomy and Institutional Catering
 interpack – International Trade Fair for the Packaging & Confectionery Industry
 K – International Trade Fair for Plastics & Rubber
 MEDICA – International Trade Fair & Congress for Medicine
 METAV - International Fair for Manufacturing Technology and Automation, organized by the German Machine Tool Builders' Association (VDW)
 METEC – International Trade Fair for the Metalworking Sector
 ProWein – International Trade Fair for Wines & Spirits
 TourNaturInternational Trade Fair for Hiking and Trekking
 Tube & Wire – International Trade Fair for the Tube & Wire Industry
 Valve World Expo International Trade Fair for Industrial Valves

Art fairs organized by Messe Düsseldorf 
 PSI Dusseldorf – International Promotional Products Trade Fair
 Von hier aus – Zwei Monate neue deutsche Kunst in Düsseldorf

References

External links

 
 Website of Düsseldorf Inside, Messe Düsseldorf guide for business travellers
 Take better notes during the PSI Dusseldorf

Companies based in Düsseldorf
Trade fairs in Germany
Convention centres in Germany
Buildings and structures in Düsseldorf
Economy of North Rhine-Westphalia
Tourist attractions in Düsseldorf
Event management companies of Germany
1993 Davis Cup